Nicola Pende (April 21, 1880 in Noicattaro – June 8, 1970 in Rome) was an Italian endocrinologist.

Biography 
He was born on April 21, 1880 in Noicattaro, in the ancient Via Garibaldi where he lived with his family during his whole childhood. After receiving his degree in Medicine and Surgery in Rome, he taught at university in Bari, Genoa, and Rome. In 1925, he founded the University of Bari and became its first chancellor. He gave birth to the modern new-ippocratism.

In 1934 he was appointed Reign Senator after declining the nomination of Academy of Italy. At the end of the thirties he joined fascism. He died on June 6, 1970 in Rome and is now buried at Campo Verano cemetery.

Citations

References 

 
 

1880 births
1970 deaths
Italian endocrinologists